Dirty Sweet is the debut four-track extended play released by Australian rock band Jet in November 2002 on Rubber Records. It was re-recorded and re-issued on 6 May 2003 by Elektra Records. All tracks on the EP are also on the band's debut album, Get Born, which followed on 14 September. Two tracks, originally on the EP, were later issued as singles from Get Born, "Rollover DJ" (November) and "Cold Hard Bitch" (March 2004).

Background
Dirty Sweet is the debut extended play by Australian rock band, Jet, which first appeared in November 2002 on Rubber Records. The line-up of Jet were Chris Cester on drums, percussion, guitar and backing vocals; his brother, Nic Cester on vocals, rhythm guitar, piano and tambourine; Cameron Muncey on lead guitar and backing vocals; and Mark Wilson on bass guitar, keyboards, harmonica, and backing vocals. Two tracks, "Take It or Leave It" and "Cold Hard Bitch" were recorded in July 2002 with Lindsay Gravina, and two more tracks, "Move On" and "Rollover DJ", in the following month with Craig Harnath.

In January 2003 the EP was re-recorded prior to Jet supporting The Rolling Stones at gigs in Sydney and Melbourne in February, on the Australian leg of their Licks Tour. Dirty Sweet was re-released on 6 May 2003 by Elektra Records.

Reception

Allmusic's MacKenzie Wilson reviewed Dirty Sweet and noted influences from AC/DC and Mick Jagger for the "impressive debut", where the group "keeps it real with raw energy; there's nothing kitschy about it". However, Stylus Magazine's Sam Bloch described their "watered-down blues-wannabe riff monsters ... the sound of a bunch of poseurs having a play at ROCK because they saw it on TV once". Drowned in Sound's Ross Bennett found that they "might not jump out and grab you; it might not make you sweat, but if you own a Stones record, and an AC/DC album, then it will do you no harm to slot this EP in between the two. There is enough musicianship, melody and spirit on this record to make you want to hear more".

Track listing

Personnel
Jet members
 Chris Cester – drums, percussion, backing vocals, tambourine
 Nic Cester – vocals, rhythm guitar
 Cameron Muncey – lead guitar, backing vocals
 Mark Wilson – bass guitar, harmonica

Additional musicians
 Andre Warhurst – slide guitar (track 3)

Production work
 Engineer – Lindsay Gravina (tracks 1, 2), Craig Harnath (tracks 3, 4)
 Producer – Lindsay Gravina (tracks 1, 2), Craig Harnath (tracks 3, 4)
 Studio – Birdland (tracks 1, 2), Hothouse (tracks 3, 4)

Art work
 Photography – Brad Jones, Melanie Fergin
 Cover art – Jet, Traffic Design Studios

References

2002 debut EPs
2003 EPs
Jet (band) albums